Oriaethus longicornis is a species of beetle in the family Cerambycidae, and the only species in the genus Oriaethus. It was described by Pascoe in 1864.

References

Phrissomini
Beetles described in 1864